Gmelina lignum-vitreum is a species of plant in the family Lamiaceae. It is endemic to New Caledonia.

References

Endemic flora of New Caledonia
lignum-vitreum
Critically endangered plants
Taxonomy articles created by Polbot